The Devonshire Quarter is an area in the centre of Sheffield, England. Its heart is the Division Street and Devonshire Street shopping areas, known for their small independent shops and variety of pubs and bars.  The district also has The Forum shopping centre and Devonshire Green, one of the largest open areas in central Sheffield.

To the west, the quarter is bounded by Sheffield's inner ring road and includes a small social housing estate.  Glossop Road and West Street are to the north, Carver Street to the east, and Moore Street and Charter Row to the south-east.

Future
The Quarter is designed to create an urban village of city living and retail, with the NRQ based mostly within the Devonshire Quarter.

Significant historic buildings

Taylor's Eye Witness Works
Beehive Works
Wharncliffe Fireclay Works
Taylor’s Ceylon Works
Aberdeen Works, Trafalgar Works, Select and Kangaroo Works
Springfield Board School
Carver Street Methodist Chapel
Facade of Mount Zion Chapel
Original developments on Division Street, Canning and Gell Street
Former Glossop Road Baths
Former Fire Station
Workshops at No 23, Carver Street
National School at No 35, Carver Street
St Matthew's Church

Character areas

West Street
Wilkinson Street and Gell Street
Devonshire Green
Holly Street/Westfield Terrace/Trafalgar Street
Milton Street

References

External links
360 degree view of Devonshire Green (QuickTime format)

Sheffield City Centre (quarters)